The Fayetteville Woodpeckers are a Minor League Baseball team of the Carolina League and the Single-A affiliate of the Houston Astros. They are located in Fayetteville, North Carolina, and play their home games at Segra Stadium. From 2017 to 2018, the team was known as the Buies Creek Astros and played at Jim Perry Stadium on the campus of Campbell University in Buies Creek, North Carolina.

History

Buies Creek
The Houston Astros began to scout locations for a baseball stadium to locate a team in Fayetteville in April 2016. In August 2016, a two-team expansion to the Carolina League was approved, with the first franchise assigned to Kinston, North Carolina.

The Fayetteville City Council approved plans to build a new stadium by 2019. This required the team to find a temporary location to play the 2017 and 2018 seasons. On November 17, it was announced the team would play at Jim Perry Stadium on the campus of Campbell University in Buies Creek and be known as the Buies Creek Astros for their first two seasons. The Astros signed a 30-year lease agreement with the city of Fayetteville in December 2016.

The Buies Creek Astros replaced the Bakersfield Blaze at the Class A-Advanced level, but are not the continuation of the Blaze. The Blaze folded along with the High Desert Mavericks after the 2016 season, contracting the California League and expanding the Carolina League. The Mavericks were replaced by the Kinston-based Down East Wood Ducks.

The Astros won the 2018 Carolina League championship.

Fayetteville
A name-the-team contest was launched to select a name for the team upon its move to Fayetteville. The finalists, selected from over 1,400 suggestions, were "Fatbacks," "Fly Traps," "Jumpers," "Wood Dogs," and "Woodpeckers." The chosen name, "Woodpeckers," was selected in honor of the red-cockaded woodpecker which was once plentiful in Fayetteville but is now an endangered species. The team's colors are black, gray, and red.

The Woodpeckers won in their first game, defeating the Potomac Nationals on the road by a score of 15-0 on April 4, 2019. The Woodpeckers played their first home game at Segra Stadium on April 18, 2019, versus the Carolina Mudcats. Fayetteville was defeated by Carolina, 7–5, before a sellout crowd of 6,202 people.

In conjunction with Major League Baseball's restructuring of Minor League Baseball in 2021, the Woodpeckers were organized into the Low-A East. In 2022, the Low-A East became known as the Carolina League, the name historically used by the regional circuit prior to the 2021 reorganization.

Roster

References

External links

Carolina League teams
Houston Astros minor league affiliates
Baseball teams established in 2017
Professional baseball teams in North Carolina
2017 establishments in North Carolina